Jamie Magowan is an Irish cricketer. He made his Twenty20 cricket debut for Northern Knights in the 2017 Inter-Provincial Trophy on 23 June 2017. He made his first-class debut for Northern Knights in the 2017 Inter-Provincial Championship on 1 August 2017.

References

External links
 

Year of birth missing (living people)
Living people
Irish cricketers
Northern Knights cricketers
Place of birth missing (living people)